Vista usually refers to a distant view.

Vista may also refer to:

Software
Windows Vista, the line of Microsoft Windows client operating systems released in 2006 and 2007
VistA, (Veterans Health Information Systems and Technology Architecture) a medical records system of the United States Department of Veterans Affairs and others worldwide
VISTA (comparative genomics), software tools for genome analysis and genomic sequence comparisons
VistaPro, and Vista, 3D landscape generation software for the Amiga and PC
VIsualizing STructures And Sequences, bioinformatics software

Organizations and institutions
Vista Entertainment Solutions, a New Zealand software company specializing in solutions for the cinema industry
AmeriCorps VISTA, a national service program to fight poverty through local government agencies and non-profit organizations
Ventura Intercity Service Transit Authority, a public transportation agency in Ventura County, California, US
Vista Community College, now Berkeley City College, a community college in Berkeley, California, US
Vista Federal Credit Union, now merged with Partners Federal Credit Union, a credit union that serves employees of The Walt Disney Company
Vista University, a now-closed South African university
Volunteers in Service to America
Vista Equity Partners
Vista Oil & Gas, an oil and gas company founded by Miguel Galuccio
Vista Outdoor, an American-based publicly-traded outdoor and shooting sports company

Places
Vista, California, United States
Playa Vista, Los Angeles, United States
Vista, Manitoba, Canada
Vista, Minnesota, United States
Vista, Missouri, United States
Vista, New York, United States
Vista, South Australia, Australia
Boa Vista, Roraima, Brazil
Boa Vista, Cape Verde
Buona Vista, Singapore
Chula Vista, California, United States
Isla Vista, California, United States
La Vista, Nebraska, United States
Mount Vista, Washington, United States
Sierra Vista, Arizona, United States
Vista Center, New Jersey, United States
Vista Hundred, Sweden
Vista Tower (Chicago), United States
Vista West, Wyoming, United States
Vista (Hong Kong)

Vehicles
Aeroprakt A-20 Vista, ultralight aircraft
Eagle Vista, a rebadged Mitsubishi Mirage sold under the Eagle brand from 1988–1992
Mitsubishi Chariot, also known as Dodge / Plymouth Colt Vista Wagon, a compact MPV
NF-16D VISTA, a variant of the Lockheed Martin F-16 fighter aircraft range with thrust vector control
Oldsmobile Vista Cruiser, a station wagon produced by Oldsmobile until 1977
Thomas Vista, a school bus produced by Thomas Built Buses until 1998
Toyota Vista, a passenger car produced by Toyota until 2003
Indica Vista, a passenger car produced by Tata Motors
 Vista-class cruise ship (2002), a class of Panamax-type cruise ships
 Vista-class cruise ship (2016), a class of cruise ships operated by the Carnival Cruise Lines

Other
VISTA (protein), an immune checkpoint protein that inhibits immune responses
Vista (song), the debut song and the debut single by K-pop girl group, Fiestar
Vista, a cape from the web serial Worm
VISTA (economics), Vietnam, Indonesia, South Africa, Turkey, Argentina as a group of emerging economies
Vista (Middle-earth), a part of the atmosphere that surrounds the world of Arda in the fiction of J. R. R. Tolkien
VISTA (telescope), Visible and Infrared Survey Telescope for Astronomy
Vista (Hong Kong), a private residential building in Hong Kong
"VISTA", a song by P-MODEL from the album P-MODEL
Vista Magazine, a bilingual English-Spanish periodical published by ImpreMedia
The Vista (part of UCentral), the student newspaper of the University of Central Oklahoma
 Vista (album)
 Vista (typeface), a type face cut by Baltimore Type Foundry

See also 
AltaVista, an Internet search engine
Buena Vista (disambiguation)
Natalia Boa Vista, a character in CSI: Miami
Vistas (disambiguation)
VistaVision, a 35mm motion picture film format
WebCT Vista, a learning management system from Blackboard Inc.